Neodiplogynium is a genus of parasitic mites belonging to the family Diplogyniidae. Members of this genus can be distinguished from related mites by the sclerotized anal and ventral plates being completely separated.

References
A new mite taken with rats in Puerto Rico (Acarina: Diplogyniidae), Irving Fox, Acarologia I

Mesostigmata